"The Sensual World" is a song by English singer-songwriter Kate Bush. It was the title track and first single from her album of the same name, released in September 1989. The single entered and peaked at No. 12 on the UK Single Chart. It was later re-recorded using only words taken from Molly Bloom's soliloquy from James Joyce's 1922 novel Ulysses, as Bush had originally intended whilst recording The Sensual World album. This version, re-titled "Flower of the Mountain", appears on the 2011 album Director's Cut.

The B-side to the original single was "Walk Straight Down the Middle", a bonus track on the CD and cassette editions of The Sensual World album. The 12-inch vinyl release of the single had a double-grooved A-side so that either the song or an instrumental version of the song would be played depending on where the needle was placed.

Writing and inspiration
The song is inspired by Molly Bloom stepping out of the black and white, two-dimensional pages of James Joyce's Ulysses into the real world, and is immediately struck by the sensuality of it all. It was originally supposed to be Molly Bloom's speech (from the end of Ulysses) set to music, but Bush could not secure the rights from the Joyce estate, so she altered it. In 2011, the Joyce estate granted license to the material, and Bush rerecorded the song as "Flower of the Mountain", released on 2011's Director's Cut.

Musically, one of the main hooks in the chorus of "The Sensual World" was inspired by a traditional Macedonian piece of music called "Antice, Džanam, Dušice". As in the traditional version, the melody is played on bagpipes, in this case uilleann pipes played by Irish musician Davy Spillane.

Critical reception
David Giles from Music Week wrote, "A dazzling return to form after a few slightly indifferent releases, finds Bush in lustful mood. Church bells herald a mellow, dreamy song with the accompaniment of an Arabic woodwind instrument. Easily the best song she's written since "Army Dreamers", even if it is slightly on the long side."

Music video
The accompanying video for "The Sensual World", which features Bush dancing through an enchanted forest in a medieval dress, was co-directed by The Comic Strip co-creator Peter Richardson and Bush herself.

Use in film
The song, particularly the chorus section, features prominently several times in Atom Egoyan's film Felicia's Journey, highlighting the main character's sense of isolation and loss as she leaves Ireland and her estranged father for England.

Track listings
All songs were written by Kate Bush.

Personnel
Kate Bush – vocals, keyboards
Paddy Bush – whip (swished fishing rod)''
Del Palmer – bass guitar, Fairlight CMI percussion
Charlie Morgan – drums
Dónal Lunny – bouzouki
John Sheahan – fiddle
Davy Spillane – uilleann pipes

Charts

References

1989 singles
1989 songs
EMI Records singles
Kate Bush songs
Music relating to James Joyce
Songs written by Kate Bush
Ulysses (novel)